Moconesi is a municipality (comune) in the Metropolitan City of Genoa in the Italian region Liguria.

Moconesi would mean "casa di Mocco", the name of an ancient Roman legate found in the bronze tablet of Polcevera, an archeological finding of 1506 recording a sentence of the Roman Senate of 111 BC. This sentence concerned a territorial dispute of families in the Polcevera Valley of Northern Genoa). The actual territories of Ferrada di Moconesi and vicinities were the property of the family Fieschi of Lavagna, before they became property of the Republic of Genoa in 1147. Moconesi was later included in the Captainship of Rapallo and within the French administration during Napoleon Bonaparte occupation of Northern Italy.

Moconesi borders the following municipalities: Cicagna, Favale di Malvaro, Lorsica, Montebruno, Neirone, Torriglia, Tribogna.

References

Cities and towns in Liguria